Robert Dilworth Etherington (19 June 1899 – 1981) was an English footballer who played in the Football League for Manchester City and Rotherham United.

He also played for Halifax Town, Hurst, Mexborough Athletic, Manchester North End and Chester City, and was signed by Mossley from Crexe Alexandra in the 1928–29 season, where he made two appearances.

References

1899 births
1981 deaths
People from Croston
English footballers
Association football outside forwards
Leyland F.C. players
Manchester City F.C. players
Rotherham United F.C. players
English Football League players
Mossley A.F.C. players
Chester City F.C. players
Halifax Town A.F.C. players
Crewe Alexandra F.C. players
Manchester North End F.C. players
Mexborough Athletic F.C. players
Ashton United F.C. players